The Suncoast Classic was a golf tournament on the Southern Africa based Sunshine Tour. It was founded in 2006 and has always been held at the Durban Country Club in Durban, KwaZulu-Natal, South Africa.

Winners

References

Former Sunshine Tour events
Golf tournaments in South Africa
Sports competitions in Durban
2006 establishments in South Africa
2011 disestablishments in South Africa